The North Fork Snake River is a tributary of the Snake River in central Colorado in the United States.  It flows from a source near Loveland Pass to a confluence with the Snake River in Keystone. Pass Lake is a secondary source of the river.

See also

 List of rivers of Colorado
 List of tributaries of the Colorado River

References

External links

Rivers of Colorado
Rivers of Summit County, Colorado
Tributaries of the Colorado River in Colorado